Luke Albert Combs (born March 2, 1990) is an American country music singer and songwriter. Born and raised in North Carolina, Combs began performing as a child, most notably performing at Carnegie Hall. After dropping out of college to pursue a career in music, he moved to Nashville, Tennessee, where he released his debut extended play, The Way She Rides, in 2014.

In 2017, Combs released his debut album, This One's for You, which reached number four on the Billboard 200. Combs released his second album, What You See Is What You Get, on November 8, 2019. The album topped the charts in multiple territories, becoming his first to do so. A deluxe version of the album was released on October 23, 2020, including the song "Forever After All".

Combs' music has earned him two Grammy Award nominations, two iHeart Radio music awards, four Academy of Country Music Awards and six Country Music Association Awards, including the 2021 & 2022 Entertainer of the Year award, their highest honor.

Early life
Combs, an only child, was born in Charlotte, North Carolina, the son of Rhonda and Chester Combs, and moved to Asheville, North Carolina, at the age of 8. He has been performing as a vocalist since childhood. While attending A. C. Reynolds High School, Combs played football and performed with multiple vocal groups, including performing a solo at Carnegie Hall. Later, he attended Appalachian State University where he worked as a bouncer at a bar before gaining stage time in that same bar. He played his first country music show at the Parthenon Cafe in Boone. With less than a month left in his senior year, he dropped out to pursue his country music career. He later moved to Nashville, Tennessee, to pursue a career in music.

Music
Combs released his first EP, The Way She Rides, in February 2014. Later that year, he released his second EP, Can I Get an Outlaw. In 2016, Combs' first single, "Hurricane", sold 15,000 copies in its first week, and debuted at number 46 on the Billboard Hot Country Songs chart. In November 2015, Combs released his third EP, This One's for You. In late 2016, Combs was named one of Sounds Like Nashville's "Artists to Watch".

Combs signed a deal with Sony Music Nashville, and the debut single from This One's for You, "Hurricane", was re-released on Columbia Nashville. "Hurricane" reached number one on the country radio airplay chart on May 15, 2017, holding that spot for two weeks.

In June 2017, Combs released his major label debut album, also titled This One's for You on Columbia Nashville and River House Artists. The album reached number one on Billboards Top Country Albums and number five on the US Billboard 200 in its first week. The album's second single, "When It Rains It Pours" was released to country radio on June 19, 2017. It reached number one on the Country Airplay chart in October 2017. The album's third single, "One Number Away" was released to country radio on January 8, 2018. In June 2018, Combs released a deluxe version titled This One's for You Too, with five bonus tracks, two of which ("She Got the Best of Me" and "Beautiful Crazy") were issued as singles with both reaching number-one. "Beautiful Crazy" reached number one on Country Airplay in February 2019, giving Combs five number-ones on the Billboard country chart with his first five singles. The song reached number one on three additional country charts – Hot Country Songs, Country Streaming Songs, and Country Digital Song Sales.

On June 11, 2019, Combs was invited to become the newest member of the Grand Ole Opry.

In August 2019, This One's for You spent its 44th week at number one on Top Country Albums, setting the record for the longest reign at the top of that chart by a male artist.

His second album What You See Is What You Get was released on November 8, 2019. The album has charted the singles "Beer Never Broke My Heart", "Even Though I'm Leaving",  "Does to Me", a duet with Eric Church, and "Lovin' on You", all of which have reached number one on the country chart.

In May 2020, Combs released the single "Six Feet Apart". The single quickly became popular to listeners as it illustrated the challenges of life during the COVID-19 pandemic. In June 2020, Combs confirmed his next single would be "Lovin' on You", which was released on both his second album and the EP The Prequel, which predated the album.

Combs announced a deluxe version of What You See Is What You Get, titled What You See Ain't Always What You Get, with five new songs; it was released on October 23, 2020. The track "Forever After All" set streaming records in country music on Apple Music and Spotify.

Combs' third album Growin' Up was released on June 24, 2022. The album has charted the singles, "Doin' This", "The Kind of Love We Make", which reached number one on the country chart and number eight on the Hot 100, and "Going, Going, Gone".

Combs' upcoming fourth album Gettin' Old will be released on March 24, 2023. A promotional single, "Growin' Up and Gettin' Old" and a single "Love You Anyway" have been released ahead of the album release.

Tours
Headlining
Don't Tempt Me with a Good Time Tour (2017–18)
Beer Never Broke My Heart Tour (2019)
What You See Is What You Get Tour (2020–21)
Growin' Up World Tour (2023)
Supporting
The Devil Don't Sleep Tour (2017) with Brantley Gilbert
High Noon Neon Tour (2018) with Jason Aldean
Here On Earth Tour (2020) with Tim McGraw

Personal life
In early 2016, Combs started dating Nicole Hocking, and the two became engaged in November 2018. They married in Florida on August 1, 2020. On January 20, 2022, Combs and Hocking announced that they were expecting their first child together, a boy, in the spring of 2022. On June 19, 2022, their son, Tex Lawrence Combs was born.

Combs began to struggle with anxiety and primarily obsessional obsessive compulsive disorder in adolescence through his college years; he has said that while it is something he has learned to control better, he still struggles with obsessive thoughts from time to time.

Discography

This One's for You (2017)
What You See Is What You Get (2019) 
Growin' Up (2022)
Gettin' Old (2023)

Awards and nominations

References

1990 births
Living people
21st-century American singers
21st-century American male singers
American country singer-songwriters
American male singer-songwriters
Country musicians from North Carolina
Musicians from Asheville, North Carolina
Singer-songwriters from North Carolina